John F. Kennedy Catholic High School was a private, Roman Catholic high school in Manchester, Missouri, United States from 1968 to 2017. It was located in the Roman Catholic Archdiocese of Saint Louis.

The property was purchased by Fontbonne University to add to the university portfolio of campuses. The university uses the campus to focus on graduate and evening programs for adult students, expanded MBA and master's programs in accounting, leadership, computer science and supply chain management, be a home for the Ed.D. program. In addition to academics, the former Kennedy campus will be used by Athletics for practice fields, gymnasiums and track.

Background
John F. Kennedy Catholic High School (Kennedy Catholic) was established in 1968 and is named after President John F. Kennedy.

General information
John F. Kennedy High School had about 280 students at time of closing.

It was the only co-educational, archdiocesan Catholic High School in West County, St. Louis, Missouri.

Kennedy had recently renovated its entire campus with its first capital campaign in 40 years, raising over $1 million. The newly remodeled building included a new entrance, commons area, cafeteria, and offices, though it still lacked windows.

Kennedy was located off of MO-141, north of Manchester Road.

Extracurricular
Kennedy offered a wide variety of student clubs and activities. Boys' sports included football, soccer, swimming, cross country, baseball, basketball, tennis, golf, and track. Girls' sports included soccer, swimming, cross country, softball, basketball, tennis, golf, track, and volleyball.

Booster Club
The Booster Club provided additional income to the Kennedy athletic program, through the sale of the Celt Club Card and various fundraising activities.  Traditionally, the Kennedy Dads were visible on Kennedy Pride Days, performing chores around the  campus and baking cookies for Open House.

Mothers' Club
The Mothers' Club met twice monthly, serving the Kennedy community and one another through spiritual support. The Mothers' Club also helped organize and disseminate Kennedy class information. Every Kennedy mother was invited to attend Mass in the chapel each month and to participate in all-school liturgies throughout the year.

Advancement Office
Kennedy's Advancement Office was the liaison between the school and the parent organizations.

Due to the financial constraints of the 2008 economic recession, Kennedy had instituted a tuition assistance initiative called "Celts Helping Celts." Fundraisers such as a Spaghetti Dinner, a Freshman Dance Party and a Mardi Gras T-shirt sale raised money that was earmarked for families who needed tuition assistance.

Clubs, sports, and activities

Athletics

Clubs

Notable alumni

Steven M. LaValle, 1986, computer scientist, roboticist, and early founder of Oculus VR.

Jay Marshall, 2001, former MLB pitcher.

Closing
In September 2016, the Archdiocese of St. Louis announced the school would be closing following the 2016–2017 school year due to declining enrollment.  As of Dec 2021 the school is going to be torn down for a new subdivision

Notes and references

Roman Catholic Archdiocese of St. Louis
Roman Catholic secondary schools in St. Louis County, Missouri
Educational institutions established in 1968
1968 establishments in Missouri
Educational institutions disestablished in 2017
2017 disestablishments in Missouri